Rosendale Common School, also known as Niskayuna Grange Hall No. 1542, is a historic school building located in the vicinity of Niskayuna in Schenectady County, New York. It was built about 1850 and is a -story, three-by-five-bay, timber-frame building on a limestone foundation.  It has a steeply pitched gable roof and a one-story, shed-roof addition from the 1960s.  The building was used as a school until 1948, when it was sold to the local Grange for use as their clubhouse.

It was added to the National Register of Historic Places in 2010.

References

School buildings on the National Register of Historic Places in New York (state)
Grange buildings on the National Register of Historic Places in New York (state)
Grange organizations and buildings in New York (state)
Schools in Schenectady County, New York
National Register of Historic Places in Schenectady County, New York